The 1966 FIBA Intercontinental Cup was the 1st official edition of the FIBA Intercontinental Cup for men's basketball clubs. It took place at Real Madrid Pavilion, Madrid, Spain. From the FIBA European Champions Cup participated Real Madrid and Ignis Varese, from the South American Club Championship participated Corinthians, and from the NABL played the Chicago Jamaco Saints.

Participants

Semi finals
January 7, Real Madrid Pavilion, Madrid

|}

3rd place game
January 8, Real Madrid Pavilion, Madrid

|}

Final
January 9, Real Madrid Pavilion, Madrid

|}

Final standings

External links 
 1966 Intercontinental Basketball Cup 

 

1966
1965–66 in American basketball
1965–66 in European basketball
1965–66 in Spanish basketball
1965–66 in South American basketball
International basketball competitions hosted by Spain